The 1938 New York state election was held on November 8, 1938, to elect the governor, the lieutenant governor, the state comptroller, the attorney general, two U.S. Senators and two U.S. Representatives-at-large, as well as all members of the New York State Assembly and the New York State Senate. The 1938 election was the first election where the Governor of New York was elected to a four-year term, rather than a two-year term.

History
The Republican state convention met on September 29, Speaker Oswald D. Heck presided. They nominated D.A. of New York Thomas E. Dewey for governor. Also nominated were Frederic H. Bontecou for lieutenant governor; Julius Rothstein for comptroller; Col. Arthur V. McDermott for attorney general; and John Lord O'Brian and Edward Corsi for the U.S. Senate. 

The Democratic state convention met on October 1, and re-nominated the incumbents Lehman, Tremaine, Bennett and Wagner; and completed the ticket with Supreme Court Justice Charles Poletti for lieutenant governor; and John M. Mead for short term in the U.S. Senate.

The Socialist state convention met on October 1, and nominated again Norman Thomas for governor; and  Dr. George W. Hartmann for lieutenant governor; Coleman B. Cheney for Comptroller; and Miss Marion L. Severn for attorney general. 

The American Labor state convention met on October 3 at the Manhattan Opera House in New York City and nominated the Democratic incumbent Herbert H. Lehman for governor. They also endorsed Democrats Poletti, Wagner, Mead, Merritt and O'Day; and completed the ticket with Langdon W. Post for Comptroller  and Joseph V. O'Leary for Attorney-General. Lehman was only able to win reelection due to the votes he received on the American Labor ballot line. Dewey received more votes on the Republican ballot line than Lehman had on the Democratic ballot line.

The "Independent Progressive" Party filed a petition to nominate a ticket headed by Republican Thomas E. Dewey. This was done to have a second ballot line, like Gov. Lehman who ran on two lines also.

The Socialist Labor Party changed its name and filed a petition to nominate candidates as the "Industrial Government Party."

Result
The whole Democratic ticket was elected.

The incumbents Lehman, Tremaine, Bennett, Wagner, Merritt and O'Day were re-elected. This was the first election where governors were elected to four year terms. 

Obs.: 
"Blank, void and scattering" votes: 75,047 (Governor)
The vote for governor is used to define ballot access, for all other offices numbers are totals on all tickets for candidates nominated on more than one.

Notes

References

Sources
Official Result: "LEHMAN PLURALITY OFFICIALLY 64,394; State Board Puts His Vote Finally at 2,391,286, With 2,326,892 for Dewey LABOR'S POLL AT 419,979 Blank, Void and Scattered Ballots Totaled 75,047; Poletti Won by 229,361", The New York Times, December 8, 1938 (subscription required)
New York Red Book

See also
New York gubernatorial elections
New York state elections

1938
1938
New York